Enrico Corradini (20 July 1865 – 10 December 1931) was an Italian novelist, essayist, journalist and nationalist political figure.

Biography
Corradini was born near Montelupo Fiorentino, Tuscany.

A follower of Gabriele D'Annunzio, he founded the newspaper Il Regno (1903-1905), together with intellectuals Giovanni Papini, Vilfredo Pareto, and Giuseppe Prezzolini. It quickly became a staple for irredentist and radical thought that was to blend into Fascism. In 1910, the Italian Nationalist Association (Associazione Nazionalista Italiana, ANI) was founded with the participation of Corradini, who was among the leaders. It made a name for itself after giving full support to Italian imperialism and the Italo-Turkish War of 1911 - Corradini wrote two political essays on the matter (Il volere d'Italia - "Italy's Desire", and L'ora di Tripoli - "Tripoli's Moment"). He expanded such bellicose theories in the weekly L'Idea Nazionale, founded by him together with Alfredo Rocco and Luigi Federzoni. Corradini also published articles in La Lupa based in Florence between 1910 and 1911. 

L'Idea Nazionale was turned into a daily with financing from natural advocates of militarism - military men and weapon manufacturers. Corradini and his paper created a generic nationalist theory after adopting Populism and Corporatism, while advocating Italy's entry into World War I - initially on the side of the Triple Alliance (the Central Powers, to which Italy had committed itself), then on that of the Triple Entente (the Allies - which promised to grant Italy all its territorial demands). The group also focused on a violent press campaign against Prime Minister Giovanni Giolitti and other supporters of neutrality.

Corradini developed the concept of Proletarian Nationalism in 1919: 

After the war, ANI was led by Corradini into a merger with the Partito Nazionale Fascista (PNF). Nonetheless, Corradini made sure to detach himself from the more controversial actions of the Blackshirts, while being nominated by Benito Mussolini to the Italian Senate, and joining his government in 1928.

As a novelist, Corradini enjoyed success with his La patria lontana ("The Distant Fatherland"; 1910) and La guerra lontana ("The Distant War"; 1911).

He died in Rome.

Works
Julius Caesar: A Play in Five Acts (1929)
Le Vie dell'Oceano (1913)

Notes

Further reading
 Cunsolo, Ronald S. "Enrico Corradini and the Italian Version of Proletarian Nationalism." Canadian Review of Studies in Nationalism 12 (1985): 47–63.
A. James Gregor, Phoenix: Fascism in Our Time (New Brunswick, N.J. : Transaction Publishers, 1999), pp. 30–33
 Marsella, M.    "Enrico Corradini's Italian Nationalism: The 'Right Wing' of the Fascist Synthesis" Journal of Political Ideologies, Volume 9, Number 2, June 2004, pp. 203–224 
 Pagano, Tullio. "From Diaspora to Empire: Enrico Corradini's Nationalist Novels." MLN, Volume 119, Number 1, January 2004 (Italian Issue), pp. 67–83

1865 births
1931 deaths
People from Montelupo Fiorentino
Italian essayists
Male essayists
Italian fascists
Italian journalists
Italian male journalists
20th-century Italian novelists
20th-century Italian male writers
Italian newspaper founders
Italian magazine founders
Italian Nationalist Association
Italian male novelists
20th-century essayists
Italian male non-fiction writers